Niclas Andersén (born 28 April 1988) is a Swedish former professional ice hockey defenceman who last played for Brynäs IF of the Swedish Hockey League (SHL). He was originally drafted by the Los Angeles Kings in the fourth round of the 2006 NHL Entry Draft, 114th overall.

Playing career 
Born in Grums, he started out with local club Grums IK moving to Leksands IF, where he made his debut in the Swedish Hockey League (SHL) during the 2005–06 season. In 2007, he joined fellow SHL side Brynäs IF and spent five years with the club. He captured the Swedish championship with Brynäs in 2012.

Andersén signed with Severstal Cherepovets of the Kontinental Hockey League (KHL) ahead of the 2012–13 season. Following his two-year KHL stint, he returned to Brynäs IF, where he captained during the 2014–15 season.

Andersén opted to finally pursue a North American career in 2015, in agreeing to a one-year entry-level contract as a free agent with the Pittsburgh Penguins of the National Hockey League (NHL) on 15 June 2015. He did not see any NHL action, but appeared in 75 games with PIttsburgh's AHL affiliate Wilkes-Barre/Scranton Penguins.

On 2 June 2016, he inked a deal to leave North America after one season in signing with Russian KHL outfit, Avtomobilist Yekaterinburg.

On 12 June 2017, Andersén agreed to a one year contract with EHC Kloten of the National League (NL). On 9 November 2017, Andersen was released by Kloten after posting a -15 plus/minus rating and scoring only 1 point in 18 games. He then joined Finnish club, Jokerit, of the KHL for the remainder of the season.

On 23 April 2018, Andersén as a free agent returned to his native Sweden signing a three-year SHL contract with former club, Brynäs IF.

International play
Andersén was a member of Sweden's bronze-winning squad at the 2014 World Championships.

Career statistics

Regular season and playoffs

International

Awards and honors

References

External links
 

1988 births
Living people
AIK IF players
Avtomobilist Yekaterinburg players
Brynäs IF players
Jokerit players
EHC Kloten players
Leksands IF players
Los Angeles Kings draft picks
Severstal Cherepovets players
Swedish ice hockey defencemen
Wilkes-Barre/Scranton Penguins players
Swedish expatriate ice hockey players in Finland
Swedish expatriate sportspeople in Russia
Swedish expatriate ice hockey players in the United States
Expatriate ice hockey players in Russia
Expatriate ice hockey players in Switzerland
Swedish expatriate sportspeople in Switzerland